Stepanyuk or Stepaniuk (Ukrainian or Russian: Степанюк) is a gender-neutral Ukrainian surname that originates from the masculine given name Stepan. It may refer to
Darya Stepanyuk (born 1990) is a Ukrainian swimmer
Kamila Lićwinko (née Stepaniuk in 1986), Polish high jumper
Oksana Stepanyuk (born 1977), Ukrainian opera singer
Ruslan Stepanyuk (born 1992), Ukrainian footballer
Yuri Stepaniuk (born 1983), Ukrainian footballer

See also
 

Ukrainian-language surnames